Sebastian Krüger (born June 30, 1963, in Hamelin, Germany) is a German artist.

After studying free painting with Prof. Dörfler at the Braunschweig University of Fine Arts he made a stunning reputation as the designer of a number of cover spreads for the press in Germany and abroad and as an illustrator and creative designer of various LP covers. He then stepped away from commercial work and became a painter. In recent years, his work has moved away from the "star caricatures" to New Pop Realism.

The artist lives and works near Hanover and in California. His primary medium is acrylic paint, and his paintings are hyper-realistic in detail, yet also extremely grotesque in their distortion. He is well known for his lifelike depictions of The Rolling Stones, in particular, Keith Richards.

References

External links
Sebastian Krüger - Artist's Official Homepage

German caricaturists
1963 births
Living people